[[File:Roque Dalton and Fayad Jamís.jpg|thumbnail|Fayad Jamís (right) and Roque Dalton in the Hoys newspaper office (1962).]]Fayad Jamís''' (1930–1988) was a Cuban poet, painter, designer, journalist and translator. He was born in Zacatecas, Mexico to a Lebanese-Cuban father and a Mexican mother. Moving to Cuba at the age of six, Jamis trained at the San Alexandro Academy before gaining renown as an abstract painter. He was a member of the modernist group of Cuban painters known as "Las Once" ("The Eleven").

Jamís lived in Paris in the 1950s, and attended the Sorbonne. The surrealist writer Andre Breton was a supporter of his work, and he co-exhibited with the sculptor Agustin Cardenas. Jamis returned to Cuba in 1959 and became involved in a wide range of activities including teaching, painting, and writing. He served as cultural attache in the Cuban embassy in Mexico for over a decade.

Jamis received the Casa de las Américas prize for his book Por Esta Libertad (For This Liberty''). His paintings can be seen in collections in Cuba and abroad. He often used pseudonyms such as Fernando Moro, Onirio Estrada or the initials F.J.N.

Jamis died in Havana in 1988. A bookshop is named after him in Calle Obispo in Havana Vieja.

References

External Links 

 Fayad Jamis Collection at the Amherst College Archives & Special Collections

1930 births
1988 deaths
Cuban painters
20th-century Cuban poets
Cuban male poets
People from Havana
Artists from Zacatecas
Writers from Zacatecas
Mexican people of Cuban descent
Cuban people of Mexican descent
Mexican people of Lebanese descent
Cuban people of Lebanese descent
20th-century Mexican male writers
Academia Nacional de Bellas Artes San Alejandro alumni